Regional elections were held in Denmark in March 1937. 11425 municipal council members were elected.
In some municipals, this election was moved to March 1938.

Results of regional elections
The results of the regional elections:

Municipal Councils

References

Local and municipal elections in Denmark
Local